Yadunandan College also known as YN College is a degree college in Dighwara, Bihar. It is a constituent unit of Jai Prakash University. College offers Intermediate and Three years Degree Course (TDC) in Arts and Science.

History 
College was established in the year 1966.

Departments 

 Arts
 Hindi
 Urdu
  English
 Philosophy
 Economics
 Political Science
 History
 Geography
 Science
 Mathematics
 Physics
 Chemistry
 Zoology
 Botany

References

External links 

 Official website
 Jai Prakash University website

Colleges in India
Constituent colleges of Jai Prakash University
Educational institutions established in 1966
1966 establishments in Bihar